Whiteson Simwanza (born December 11, 1984), also known as White Simwanza, is a Zambian football middlefielder who played last time for RoPS. Simwanza had a contract with RoPS until the end of season 2011. But it was terminated at the end of season 2009.

Simwanza came to RoPS and Rovaniemi before Finnish Premier Division season 2009 started. He signed with RoPS 3-years long contract, until end of season 2011. Due his playing style, he was leading the charts of collecting yellow cards in Finnish Premier Division season 2009. Currently he has collected seven yellow cards in eleven games and later at the end of season he was on the top of table after collecting 10 yellow cards. After his first season with RoPS, the team was relegated to Finnish Ykkönen and Simwanza was released on a free.

Simwanza has played in Zambia's national football team. According to the RoPS official site he has played nine games.

External links
  at rops.fi
  at veikkausliiga.com
  at soccerway.com

References

1984 births
Zambian footballers
Zambian expatriate footballers
Zambia international footballers
Association football midfielders
Expatriate footballers in Finland
Zambian expatriate sportspeople in Finland
Veikkausliiga players
Rovaniemen Palloseura players
Living people
Young Arrows F.C. players
Red Arrows F.C. players